Jeffrey Reiner is an American film director, editor, screenwriter, television director, and producer.

Career
Since the late 1980s, he has amassed a number of credits in the film and television industry. He edited the films Cheerleader Camp, Think Big, 3 Ninjas Kick Back, and BASEketball.

He began directing television and film during the 1990s, his credits include Mighty Morphin Power Rangers, The Sentinel, Trouble Bound, Haunted, Columbo, The Division, Surface, Friday Night Lights, Caprica and Trauma.

He was executive producer and house director for the NBC series The Event under his deal with Universal Media Studios during the show's 2010–2011 run.

In 2011, Reiner was chosen to direct the pilot for a David E. Kelley-produced Wonder Woman television series for NBC. The pilot was ultimately not picked up for series.

Between 2014 and 2017, Reiner directed sixteen episodes of the television drama The Affair. The show subsequently won a Golden Globe for Best TV Series, Drama. Reiner departed The Affair after its third season. In December 2019, it was reported that he left the series after an investigation was opened into an alleged encounter with writers from the TV series Girls in which Reiner lewdly discussed on-screen nudity on The Affair and shared a picture of a nude male body double. Reiner has also worked on the FX TV series Fargo.

References

External links

American film directors
American male screenwriters
American television directors
American television producers
AFI Conservatory alumni
Living people
Place of birth missing (living people)
Year of birth missing (living people)
American film editors